Böyürbinə (formerly known as Sarıgüney) is a village in the Kalbajar District of Azerbaijan.

References

External links

Populated places in Kalbajar District